Shalinsky District is the name of several administrative and municipal districts in Russia:
Shalinsky District, Chechen Republic, an administrative and municipal district of the Chechen Republic
Shalinsky District, Sverdlovsk Oblast, an administrative district of Sverdlovsk Oblast

See also
Shalinsky (disambiguation)

References